Matador is an American television series co-created by Roberto Orci, Andrew Orci, Dan Dworkin, and Jay Beattie. The series chronicled the rise of popular soccer star Tony "Matador" Bravo (Gabriel Luna), known for his exploits both on and off the field. Unbeknownst to the public and his family, he is also a skilled covert operative performing missions for a branch of the CIA. The series premiered on July 15, 2014, on the newly launched channel El Rey Network.

Executive producers are showrunners Beattie and Dworkin, Roberto Orci, Alex Kurtzman, and Heather Kadin of K/O Paper Products, and Robert Rodriguez along with FactoryMade Ventures and El Rey Network co-founders John Fogelman and Cristina Patwa. Beattie and Dworkin wrote the first episode, which was directed by Rodriguez.

Despite originally being renewed for a second season prior to its premiere, El Rey canceled the show, citing a lack of international success.

Plot
In this scripted action series, Tony Bravo (Gabriel Luna) is a DEA agent recruited by the CIA to infiltrate the Los Angeles Riot, a professional soccer team.  The CIA suspects the Riot's owner, Andrés Galan (Alfred Molina), of using his vast resources to fund illicit activities. During team tryouts, Bravo seriously injures one of the Riot players in a confrontation on the field, initially earning the ire of the owner and the team.  When footage of the incident goes viral, earning Bravo the nickname "Matador", Galan sees marketing potential in his popular new star.

Cast and characters

Main
 Gabriel Luna as Tony "Matador" Bravo, soccer player for the L.A. Riot and CIA mole 
 Nicky Whelan as Annie Mason 
 Neil Hopkins as Noah Peacott
 Alfred Molina as Andrés Galan, owner of the L.A. Riot soccer franchise
 Tanc Sade as Alec Holester, star striker for the L.A. Riot and former English National Player

Recurring
 Yvette Monreal as Senna Galan, a celebutante and daughter of L.A. Riot team owner Andrés Galan
 Elizabeth Peña as Maritza Sandoval, mother to Tony, Ricky, and Cristina
 Julio Oscar Mechoso as Javi Sandoval, Maritza's husband, stepfather to Tony, and father to Ricky, and Cristina
 Louis Ozawa Changchien as Samuel, Galan's dangerous chief enforcer and right hand man
 Sammi Rotibi as Didi Akinyele, assistant head coach for the L.A. Riot
 Jonny Cruz as Ricky Sandoval, son of Maritza and Javi, who was initially in prison
 Isabella Gomez as Cristina Sandoval, teenage daughter of Maritza and Javi
 Peter Gadiot as Caesar, a former dancer
 Christopher Cousins as CIA Deputy Director Llewyn Wayne Smith, who is in charge of the department recruiting Tony
 Eve Torres as Reyna Flores, a sideline journalist reporting on Tony's career
 Margot Bingham as Abigail "Billie" Fisher, a CIA analyst

Production
Production for Matador began on April 3, 2014.

Reception
Matador has received favorable reviews. On Metacritic, the show holds a score of 62 out of 100, based on 10 critics, indicating "generally favorable" reviews. On Rotten Tomatoes, the show holds a rating of 67% based on 12 reviews, with the consensus reading: "Though choppy at times, Matador is fast-paced, silly fun that benefits from not taking itself too seriously".

Episodes

References

External links
 
 

2014 American television series debuts
2014 American television series endings
2010s American drama television series
American action television series
English-language television shows
Television series by Entertainment One
Television series created by Roberto Orci